Count  was a Japanese  samurai and politician during the Bakumatsu and early Meiji period of Japanese history.

Early life 

Gotō was born in Tosa Domain (present day Kōchi Prefecture). Together with fellow Tosa samurai Sakamoto Ryōma, he was attracted by the radical pro-Imperial Sonnō jōi movement. After being promoted, he essentially seized power within the Tosa Domain's politics and exerted influence on Tosa daimyō Yamauchi Toyoshige to call on shōgun Tokugawa Yoshinobu to return power peacefully to the Emperor.

Meiji statesman and liberal agitator 
After the Meiji Restoration, Gotō was appointed to a number of posts, including that of Governor of Osaka, and sangi (councillor), but later left the Meiji government in 1873 over disagreement with the government's policy of restraint toward Korea (i.e. the Seikanron debate) and, more generally, in opposition to the Chōshū-Satsuma domination of the new government. Jointly with Itagaki Taisuke, he submitted a memorandum calling for the establishment of a popularly elected parliament. In 1874, together with Itagaki Taisuke, and Etō Shinpei and Soejima Taneomi of Hizen Province, he formed the Aikoku Kōtō (Public Party of Patriots), declaring, "We, the thirty millions of people in Japan are all equally endowed with certain definite rights, among which are those of enjoying and defending life and liberty, acquiring and possessing property, and obtaining a livelihood and pursuing happiness. These rights are by Nature bestowed upon all men, and, therefore, cannot be taken away by the power of any man." This anti-government stance appealed to the discontented remnants of the samurai class and the rural aristocracy (who resented centralized taxation) and peasants (who were discontented with high prices and low wages).

After the Osaka Conference of 1875, he returned briefly to the government, participating in the Genrōin. He also managed a coal mine in Kyūshū (the Takashima Coal Mine), but finding it to be losing money, sold his interest to Iwasaki Yatarō.

In 1881, he returned to politics, assisting Itagaki Taisuke found the Jiyūto (Liberal Party) which developed the daidō danketsu (coalition) movement in 1887.

Meiji bureaucrat 
In 1889, Gotō joined the Kuroda administration as Communications Minister, remaining in that post under the first Yamagata cabinet and first Matsukata cabinet. Under the new kazoku peerage system, he was elevated to hakushaku (count). In the second Itō cabinet he became Agriculture and Commerce minister.  He was implicated in a scandal involving futures trading, and was forced to retire. After a heart attack, he retired to his summer home in Hakone, Kanagawa, where he died in 1896. His grave is at the Aoyama Cemetery in Tokyo.

Notes

References
 Beasley, William G.  (1995). The Rise of Modern Japan: Political, Economic and Social Change Since 1850. New York: St. Martin's Press. ; ;  OCLC 20722016
 Hane, Mikiso. (2001). Modern Japan: A Historical Survey. Westview Press. 
 Hillsborough, Romulus. (2005). Shinsengumi: The Shogun's Last Samurai Corps. Rutland, Vermont: Tuttle Publishing. 
 Jansen, Marius B. and Gilbert Rozman, eds. (1986). Japan in Transition: from Tokugawa to Meiji. Princeton: Princeton University Press. ;  OCLC 12311985
 Nussbaum, Louis-Frédéric and Käthe Roth. (2005).  Japan encyclopedia. Cambridge: Harvard University Press. ;  OCLC 58053128
 Totten, George O. (1966). Democracy in Prewar Japan: Groundwork or Facade?. Boston: D.C. Heath and Company.

External links 

 National Diet Library biography & photo

1838 births
1897 deaths
Meiji Restoration
Samurai
People from Kōchi Prefecture
People from Tosa Domain
Kazoku
People of Meiji-period Japan
Governors of Osaka
Government ministers of Japan
Aikoku Kōtō politicians
Liberal Party (Japan, 1881) politicians
Recipients of the Order of the Rising Sun
Politicians from Kōchi Prefecture
Burials in Japan